Edward Aemilius Jarvis (April 25, 1860 – December 19, 1940) was a Canadian financier, equestrian, and sailor.

Life and career

A member of a Toronto family of Loyalist descent, Jarvis apprenticed as a banker, and eventually became president of the Trader's Bank of Canada.  Jarvis founded the Steel Company of Canada. He built Toronto's iconic King Edward Hotel and created the British Columbia Salmon Canning Industry.  Jarvis also formed Æmilius Jarvis & Co., earning the friendship and respect of such men as Lord Minto (Governor General of Canada), J.P. Morgan, Sir Thomas Lipton, Lord Beaverbrook, Sir Henry Pellatt, Edward Roper Curzon Clarkson and world-champion rower Ned Hanlan.  Jarvis was instrumental in forming the Royal Canadian Navy during World War I, recruiting both ships and men, & acted as a spy for King George V while visiting Tzar Nicholas of Russia in 1915.  He also operated a stud farm -called Hazelburn- in Aurora, Ontario, breeding hunter-jumper horses.

Jarvis' grandson Robert Aemilius Jarvis published the dramatic biography/auto-biography of his grandfather, "The Last Viking".

Legendary yachtsman
Jarvis sailed alone around Lake Ontario, from Hamilton to Niagara-on-the-Lake to Whitby and back, in a tiny dinghy aptly called Tar Pot when he was just twelve years old.   Later in life, he spent two years sailing the world in a square-rigger sailing vessel.  He designed and built racing sailboats, founded the Royal Hamilton Yacht Club, and was a longtime member of the Royal Canadian Yacht Club, of which he was elected commodore seven times.  He won the inaugural Canada's Cup yachting race in 1896 sailing the Canada, a 57-foot cutter. Additionally, he won over 100 international freshwater sailing events while at Royal Canadian Yacht Club (& more than 300 overall), including a second Canada's Cup in 1901.

Aemilius skippered in every Canada's Cup from 1896-1907 with the sole exception of the 1905 edition; Cup Defenders Rochester Yacht Club made it a stipulation that Jarvis not skipper in order to accept R.C.Y.C.'s challenge.  R.C.Y.C.'s Temeraire ultimately lost the 30-foot class match-series to Rochester's Iroquois.

As a skipper, Jarvis lived by the credo, "A place for everything, & everything in its place," a saying which he took so seriously (for in-race safety reasons) that he was known to throw crew members' items overboard if found laying haphazardly about.

He published an account of sailing his yacht, Haswell, from Toronto to the Caribbean in the winter of 1920-21 entitled, "5,000 Miles in a 27-Tonner."

Ontario bond scandal

Jarvis was convicted on a charge of conspiracy to defraud the government of the Province of Ontario, after having saved that government millions of dollars in the retirement of war bonds. Though he was jailed for six months, for the remainder of his life he defended his innocence.  He'd refused, against all advice, to testify in his own defence, and one theory as to why is that he was shielding/taking a fall for his son, also charged in the affair, after having tragically lost another son previously in World War I.  His business peers signed a petition detailing the reasoned argument for Jarvis' innocence, which was proven when he took the stand in the trial of another charged in the affair.  He was ultimately technically cleared, though not officially by the Ontario Government.  The former Premier of Ontario, Ernest C. Drury (United Farmers of Ontario party), labelled him "Canada's Dreyfus," a reference to Alfred Dreyfus who was wrongfully charged and jailed in his native France (around the turn of the century) for blatantly political reasons.

Military 

Jarvis actively supported the Royal Canadian Navy during World War I, recruiting anti-submarine (& other) ships, and over 2000 men.  He acted as an unofficial spy for King George V while visiting Russia on business in 1915, delivering a message to George's cousin Tzar Nicholas via an intermediary to encourage Russia to stay in the war, in order to maintain two fronts on Germany.  (The intermediary was shortly thereafter assassinated on a train platform immediately following passing -and ignoring- Jarvis in a train-car corridor, with several "ugly" men following close behind her.)  Aemilius was recognized by the Navy League of Canada's award of its unofficial “Special Service Decoration” for his wartime contributions.

See also
Canada's Cup
Royal Hamilton Yacht Club
Aemilius Jarvis: 5000 Miles in a 27-Tonner
Royal Canadian Yacht Club

References

1860 births
1940 deaths
Businesspeople from Ontario
Canadian Anglicans
Canadian male sailors (sport)
People from the Regional Municipality of York
Sportspeople from Ontario